Jacqueline Sassard (13 March 1940 – 17 July 2021) was a French actress who appeared in Italian films such as Guendalina directed by Alberto Lattuada, a young woman with family and financial troubles in Luigi Zampa's Il Magistrato and Valerio Zurlini's Violent Summer (1959), in which her character was left by Jean-Louis Trintignant. 

In 1959 she also played in Italy the role of an English journalist on a business trip to the Kingdom of Naples in the comedy film Ferdinando I °, Re di Napoli (Ferdinand the 1st, King of Naples) starring the brothers Eduardo, Peppino and Titina De Filippo, Neapolitan leading figures of Italian theater. In the cast were also other glorious names of Italian comedy such as Aldo Fabrizi, Vittorio De Sica, Renato Rascel as well as a young Marcello Mastroianni.

Her best remembered role was in Joseph Losey's Accident, with a script by Harold Pinter (1967), where she played an Austrian princess. Her final screen appearance was in Le voleur de crimes (Crime Thief), directed by Nadine Trintignant in 1969.

She left the film industry on her marriage to Gianni Lancia. They lived for a number of years in Brazil before returning to live in Alpes-Maritimes in the south of France. They had a son, Lorenzo Lancia. Gianni Lancia died in 2014.

Sassard died on 17 July 2021, at the age of 81.

Selected filmography
Je plaide non coupable (1956)
Guendalina (1957)
 March's Child (1958)
Three Murderesses (1958)
Everyone's in Love (1959)
Il Magistrato (1959)
Violent Summer (1959)
Ferdinando I, re di Napoli (1959)
My Son, the Hero (1962)
Freddy and the Song of the South Pacific (1962)
Seasons of Our Love (1966)
Accident (1967)
Les Biches (1968)
'' Le voleur de crimes (Crime Thief) (1969)

References

External links
 

1940 births
2021 deaths
French film actresses
People from Nice